Detective Sergeant David Gabriel is a fictional character featured in TNT's The Closer, portrayed by Corey Reynolds. Gabriel was a Sergeant in the Los Angeles Police Department's (LAPD) Priority Homicide Division. He was promoted to Detective during season five. He is seen as Deputy Chief Brenda Leigh Johnson's right-hand man.

Early in the series, Sgt. Gabriel is a bright young officer eager to make his mark in the department. One of his strengths is he can defer to someone else when provided with a well thought-out reason to do so. As a consequence, he was one of the first to accept Deputy Chief Johnson. Commander Taylor has tried to recruit him from Johnson at least once.

In the second season, Sgt. Gabriel confesses to Deputy Chief Johnson that he and Detective Irene Daniels are dating; Brenda initially did not receive this well, but she eventually comes to terms with it. In the third season, Sgt. Gabriel expresses an interest in entering politics and  deftly provides a solution to avoid budget cuts and the loss of a member from Priority Homicide. Despite being told he is Johnson's favorite, Gabriel becomes confrontational with her in one case regarding a former gang member turned politician and another from beating a confession out of a suspected child molester. After the latter incident, Johnson suspends him for 10 days without pay.

Personality and traits
Friendly and polite, Gabriel is one of the few officers who was accepting and kind to Deputy Chief Johnson when she first joins the LAPD. He is highly organized, ambitious and intelligent. Although Gabriel is eager to please Deputy Chief Johnson now that she is his superior, he is outspoken and not afraid to tell her exactly what he thinks. Sgt. Gabriel can be polite and loyal to a fault and many of the detectives accuse him of being a "suck-up". He doesn't take criticism well and craves constant reassurance and recognition from his superiors. While he does tend to have the same commitment to justice as Deputy Chief Johnson, on a few major incidents he has been very critical of Deputy Chief Johnson which lead to consequences for both of them. Despite this, Deputy Chief Johnson has continually look to Gabriel as her right-hand man.

Personal life
Gabriel started off as a rookie cop with the LAPD and moved on to work in Robbery-Homicide under then-Captain Taylor. With Taylor's encouragement, he received a master's degree in Public Administration from the University of Southern California. He enthusiastically campaigned to gain his current position on the newly formed Priority Homicide Division. Before Johnson joined the LAPD, Sgt. Gabriel was staunchly loyal to Commander Taylor. However, the Commander's attempts to undermine Johnson caused Gabriel to lose respect for him.

Gabriel admires Deputy Chief Johnson's interrogation skills and looks to her as a mentor, although he accuses her of not complimenting him enough. He goes above and beyond to please the Deputy Chief, whether that means driving her around Los Angeles or caring for her cat's newborn kittens while she's out of town.

At the end of season four, Gabriel has broken up with Daniels, and apparently they did not part on the best of terms. Their squabbling becomes enough of a distraction for the squad that Daniels has to be transferred to another department.

In season 5, Gabriel takes the detective's exam and is laterally promoted to Detective II.

In season 7, it is revealed that Gabriel's girlfriend is the mole feeding inside information about Major Crimes to defense attorney Peter Goldman.  He subsequently transfers out of the Division at the end of season 7 and is made the LAPD Liaison Officer to the Los Angeles County District Attorney Bureau of Investigation at the insistence of Deputy Chief Johnson.

Awards and decorations
The following are the medals and service awards fictionally worn by Detective Gabriel.

References

Fictional Los Angeles Police Department detectives
The Closer characters